Kauno Antero Kleemola (5 July 1906, in Kälviä – 12 March 1965, in Kannus) was a Finnish politician from the Agrarian League. 

Kleemola was a farmer from Central Ostrobothnia and as politician an advocate of Central Ostrobothnia in Helsinki. He was speaker of the parliament 1962-1965 and minister in several cabinets of Kekkonen, and hold the title of Deputy Prime Minister in 1961. Kekkonen designated him as the prime minister in December 1958; Kleemola, however, failed to form cabinet.

References 

1906 births
1965 deaths
People from Kokkola
People from Vaasa Province (Grand Duchy of Finland)
Centre Party (Finland) politicians
Deputy Prime Ministers of Finland
Ministers of Defence of Finland
Ministers of Trade and Industry of Finland
Ministers of Transport and Public Works of Finland
Speakers of the Parliament of Finland
Members of the Parliament of Finland (1939–45)
Members of the Parliament of Finland (1948–51)
Members of the Parliament of Finland (1951–54)
Members of the Parliament of Finland (1958–62)
Members of the Parliament of Finland (1962–66)
Finnish people of World War II